Eschborn Airfield (Fliegerhorst Eschborn) is an abandoned military airfield in Germany located approximately 10 km northwest of Frankfurt am Main (Hessen) and 435 km southwest of Berlin.

The airfield was built by the Luftwaffe and opened in the early 1940s. Its primary use was as an interceptor fighter airfield during the Defense of the Reich campaign. In 1945 it was seized by the United States Army and was used as a combat airfield by Ninth Air Force during the Western Allied invasion of Germany.

After the war the airfield became part of "Camp Eschborn", one of the United States Army facilities in the Frankfurt Area. It was closed in 1992 as part of the drawdown of American forces in Europe after the Cold War ended. Today the area is being redeveloped as an industrial site.

History

German use during World War II
Eschborn Airfield was built by the Luftwaffe about 1942 to provide air defense of the Frankfurt am Main area from Allied bomber attacks. A 1,600m concrete runway, aligned 12/30 was laid down, along with taxiways, dispersal aircraft hardstands, a support area and other buildings.

Jagdgeschwader 106 (JG 106), a Focke-Wulf Fw 190A  day interceptor fighter unit was assigned to the airfield in March 1943. In August 1943, JG 106 was moved to Mannheim and replaced by JG 27, a Messerschmitt Bf 109G unit that was being withdrawn from North Africa. JG 27 was based at Eschborn until September 1944. Other Luftwaffe day interceptor units assigned to Eschborn were JG 53 (March–May 1944); JG 301 (May–June 1944) and JG 2 (September 1944), flying mostly Bf 109Gs, or Fw 190As (JG 2).

In response to the interceptor attacks on Eighth Air Force heavy bomber formations, Eschborn was attacked in 1944 by XIII Fighter Command P-51 Mustang escort fighters that would drop down on the airfield and perform fighter sweeps over targets of opportunity. As Allied ground forces moved east into Central France, the airfield came within range of Ninth Air Force air units, which attacked the airfield with B-26 Marauder medium bombers and P-47 Thunderbolts. These attacks would take place when Eighth Air Force heavy bombers (B-17s, B-24s) were within interception range of the Luftwaffe aircraft assigned to the base, with the attacks being timed to have the maximum effect possible to keep the interceptors pinned down and unable to attack the heavy bombers.

USAAF use
United States Third Army units moved into the Frankfurt area during mid-March 1945, and ground forces captured Eschborn Airfield about 25 March. On 30 March, combat engineers from IX Engineer command 832d and 825th Engineering Aviation Battalions arrived to make the airfield operational for American aircraft. A Pierced Steel Planking runway was laid down over the damaged concrete runway and enough repairs were made to make the airfield operational by early April.  The airfield was designated as Advanced Landing Ground "Y-74 Frankfurt/Eschborn" and immediately put to use as a transport resupply and casualty (S&E) evacuation airfield. C-47 Skytrain transports used the airfield frequently.

On 7 April, Ninth Air Force P-47 Thunderbolts arrived at Eschborn. The 371st Fighter Group and the 367th Fighter Group flew combat missions with Thunderbolts until the end of the war in May. The 367th remained at the airfield until mid-July 1945 when the Air Force turned the Eschborn airfield and base over to Army ground forces, which used the facility as an occupation garrison.

United States Army use
Under Army control in July 1945, for a while Eschborn became a Displaced Persons camp while Europe tried to sort out the masses of people forcefully removed from their home nations during the war. Also, Eschborn remained an Air Technical Service Command facility until 1947 to process out excess American aircraft and to destroy surrendered Luftwaffe aircraft. The Luftwaffe buildings were repaired and reconstructed, the facility eventually becoming a major Army garrison as part of the Army of Occupation.

During the 1950s, as a part of the United States Army NATO facilities in the Frankfurt area, the airfield was closed and Eschborn Airfield became "Camp Eschborn", the home of Army Engineering units. Army forces remained at Eschborn for the next 40 years during the Cold War, being withdrawn in 1992 as part of the general American drawdown of forces in Germany.

The facility has been basically abandoned since 1992, and today the ghostly relics of empty buildings, streets and other facilities used by the United States Army during its 50-year use of Eschborn remain. Parts of the former military base are being redeveloped into an industrial estate. The airfield, not used since 1947, remains in part with an abandoned aircraft parking apron and a large Luftwaffe hangar, used for storage by the Army, but now a reminder of the wartime past of Eschborn as a combat airfield by both German and United States forces.

See also

Advanced Landing Ground

References

External links
Camp Eschborn Photos
Eschborn Airfield 1946

Airfields of the United States Army Air Forces in Germany
Airports established in 1942
1942 establishments in Germany
Airports in Hesse